The Umm Irna Formation is a geological formation in Jordan. It is found in several outcrops in Jordan in the area around the eastern shore of the Dead Sea. It is Late Permian (likely Changhsingian) in age, and is the oldest unit in the succession, overlying the Cambrian aged Umm Ishrin Sandstone Formation. The formation predominantly consists of sandstones, claystones and mudstones deposited in fluvial and lacustrine conditions. The formation is of considerable paleobotanical interest, as it preserves the earliest known remains of plant groups that would become widespread during the Mesozoic, including Corystosperm seed ferns, represented by the widespread Triassic genus Dicroidium, cycads (cf. Ctenis), podocarp conifers, as well as Bennettitales. Other plant groups present in the formation include Noeggerathiales, gigantopterids, lyginopterids and possible ginkgophytes.

References 

Geologic formations of Jordan
Permian System of Asia
Lopingian geology
Shale formations
Siltstone formations
Sandstone formations
Paleontology in Jordan